Gualeguaychú may refer to:
 Gualeguaychú, Entre Ríos, a city in the province of Entre Ríos, Argentina
 the Gualeguaychú meteorite of 1932, which fell in Entre Rios, Argentina (see meteorite fall)
 Gualeguaychú Airport, serving the city in Entre Ríos
 Gualeguaychú Department, an administrative subdivision (departamento) of the province of Entre Ríos, Argentina
 Gualeguaychú River, a river in the province of Entre Ríos, Argentina

Guaraní words and phrases